Richard Deacon CBE (born 15 August 1949) is a British abstract sculptor, and a winner of the Turner Prize.

Life and work

Deacon was born in Bangor, Wales and educated at Plymouth College. He then studied at the Somerset College of Art, Taunton, at St Martin's School of Art, London, and at the Royal College of Art, also in London. He left the Royal College in 1977, and went on to study part-time at the Chelsea School of Art. Deacon's first one-person show came in 1978 in Brixton.

Deacon's work is abstract, but often alludes to anatomical functions. His works are often constructed from everyday materials such as laminated plywood, and he calls himself a "fabricator" rather than a "sculptor". His early pieces are typically made up of sleek curved forms, with later works sometimes more bulky.

Deacon's body of work includes small-scale works suitable for showing in art galleries, as well as much larger pieces shown in sculpture gardens and objects made for specific events, such as dance performances.

Deacon won the Turner Prize in 1987 (nominated for his touring show For Those Who Have Eyes) having previously been nominated in 1984.

Deacon was made a Commander of the Order of the British Empire (CBE) in the 1999 New Year Honours List. In 2007, he represented Wales at the Venice Biennale.  He was one of the five artists shortlisted for the Angel of the South project in January 2008.

Tate held a retrospective show of his work in 2014. In 2017, Deacon won the "Ernst Franz Vogelmann-Preis für Skulptur", Heilbronn. Also in 2017, he was made an Honorary Fellow of the Arts University Plymouth (formerly Plymouth College of Art.

See also
 List of Turner Prize winners and nominators

Notes and references

External links
richarddeacon.net
Richard Deacon, fabricator and Turner prize winner, gets Tate retrospective
Biography and images at LA Louver gallery
Actual exhibitions, works in museums and galleries
Between the Eyes, Queens Quay, Toronto, Ontario

1949 births
Living people
20th-century British sculptors
20th-century Welsh male artists
21st-century British sculptors
21st-century Welsh male artists
Alumni of Chelsea College of Arts
Alumni of the Royal College of Art
Alumni of Saint Martin's School of Art
Commanders of the Order of the British Empire
Academic staff of the École des Beaux-Arts
Members of the Academy of Arts, Berlin
People educated at Plymouth College
People from Bangor, Gwynedd
Royal Academicians
Turner Prize winners
Welsh contemporary artists
Welsh male sculptors